Village Hastsal is a census town and village in West district in the Indian state of Delhi.

History 
According to legend, this area was once submerged in water and elephants used to rest here. In Hindi, elephants are known as "Hathi" and place is known as "Sthal"; hence, Hastsal - the resting place of elephants.

In the 17th century Mughal Emperor Shahjahan had a hunting lodge in Hastsal. 1650, he built the Mini Qutub Minar close to his hunting lodge. It is now situated at corner of Hastsal village and is popularly known as the Laat (Pillar). The minaret and hunting lodge, both still exist but lay abandoned and crumbling. The minaret closely resembles the Qutub Minar in design.

Demographics 
 India census, Hastsal had a population of 176,877. Males constitute 55% of the population and females 45%. Hastsal has an good literacy rate of 83.71 %,  male literacy is 90.51%, and female literacy is 75.84%.  In Hastsal, 18% of the population is under 6 years of age.

Educational Institutes 
Hastsal and adjoining regularized - unauthorized colonies such as Vikas Nagar has a large number of private schools that cater to the local population residing in these colonies.

References

External links 
 Hastsal Minar - 9 July 2010

Cities and towns in West Delhi district